Deadly Visions is a 2004 made-for-television film starring Nicollette Sheridan, Gordon Currie, Sarah Deakins, Philip Granger, Haili Page and Frida Betrani. It was directed by Michael Scott and written by John Murlowski.

The film is also known as Possessed (the USA DVD title) and Transplant (the Canadian working title).

Synopsis
A woman (Nicollette Sheridan) who underwent an eye transplant is haunted by visions of her donor's last moments of life, and she is convinced that the woman was murdered.

References

External links

2004 television films
2004 films
American television films
2000s English-language films